Tim Regan (born June 27, 1981) is a former American soccer defender.

College
Regan played college soccer at Bradley University from 1999 to 2002, where he established himself as one of the best players in the program's history.  After starting 20 games as a freshman, Regan was named second-team All-Missouri Valley Conference as a sophomore, after registering two goals and two assists from a defensive midfield position.  Regan was moved to defense as a junior, and proved more than up to the task - he finished the year as a first-team All-MVC winner, and the team's co-MVP with Gavin Glinton.  Regan remained at defense as a senior and performed even better, winning MVC Defensive Player of the Year while being instrumental in the team posting a 0.81 goals against average.

Professional
Upon graduating, Regan was selected 17th overall in the 2003 MLS SuperDraft by MetroStars of Major League Soccer.  Regan was versatile, but not overly impressive in MLS. As a rookie, he appeared in 15 games, starting seven, at numerous positions in the defense and midfield.  Regan received less playing time in 2004, playing in just 12 games. His hard work was rewarded with an expanded role in 2005, as he started 18 out of 20 matches. However, on March 1, 2006, Regan was released by MetroStars. One month later he was signed by his former Metro coach Bob Bradley at Chivas USA where he became a surprise starter.

After the 2006 season, Regan was picked up by Toronto FC in the 2006 MLS Expansion Draft, but later traded to New York Red Bulls (the former MetroStars) for forward Edson Buddle.  He was waived by New York during the 2007 season.

In the spring of 2008, Regan trained with Chicago Fire and appeared in a preseason games for his hometown club, but was not offered a contract.  Later that season, he would, however, sign a 'one-day contract' with Toronto FC — who were missing nine players to international duty — in order to play in a game against his former club, Chivas USA. Regan eventually signed a deal with Toronto that kept him at the club until the end of the season. He retired following the 2008 season to become Toronto's head of scouting.

He is also a "Soccer Operations & Scouting" instructor for the online sports career training school, Sports Management Worldwide, in Portland, OR.

Coaching career
On November 11, 2013, Regan was named as assistant coach for Indy Eleven of the NASL. On June 2, 2015, Regan was named Indy's interim head coach, following the dismissal of Juergen Sommer.

Regan currently is an assistant coach for his alma mater, Bradley, under the Braves' 22nd-year head coach, Jim DeRose. He also became the head coach of USL League Two expansion club Peoria City in 2020.

References

External links
 Bradley University Soccer Awards
 Chivas USA player
 MetroStars player profile
 Chicago Fire article

1981 births
Living people
American soccer players
Association football defenders
Bradley Braves men's soccer players
Chicago Fire U-23 players
Chivas USA players
Expatriate soccer players in Canada
Indy Eleven coaches
Major League Soccer players
New York Red Bulls draft picks
New York Red Bulls players
North American Soccer League coaches
Soccer players from Illinois
Sportspeople from Cook County, Illinois
Toronto FC players
USL League Two players